Adane Girma (born 25 June 1985) is an Ethiopian former professional footballer who played as a striker. He was a member of the Ethiopia national team from 2006 to 2015 and made 45 appearances scoring 9 goals.

Club career
Adane began his career with Hawassa Kenema FC in summer 2007, then left the team and moved to Saint-George SA. He was later transformed to striker, a role in which he did very well by being one of the best scorers of the Ethiopian Premier League in the 2009–10 season. He can also play at full-back. Adane and Getaneh Kebede of Dedebit FC shared the 2010–11 Ethiopian Premier League goal scoring title after they finished the season with 20 goals each. He was also awarded as best player of the league in that season.

In 2018, Adane was let go by his long time club Saint George S.C. Soon after Adane was able to agree to a contract with his former club Hawassa Kenema FC.

International career
Adane was a key player for the Ethiopia national team during the qualification of the 2013 African Cup of Nations. On his first appearance of African Cup of Nations, Adane played at central midfielder position in place of another sensational young midfielder Addis Hintsa. Because of the more cautious approach to the first match against 2012 Champions Zambia, the Coach chose to play Adane in the central position, leaving Addis Hintsa on the bench. With great skill and short passing, Adane managed to lead the team to a draw. His team played with only 10-man for more than 70 minutes of the match. Shortly after the introduction of Addis Hintsa, Adane played in a more in attacking position. On the 65th minute, Adane would receive a great pass from the striker Saladin Said which he converted it to a magnificent low corner goal.

Adane was named to the Ethiopian squad for the 2013 Africa Cup of Nations. He scored the equalizer in team Ethiopia's first match against Zambia in the 2013 Africa Cup of Nations, in Nelspruit, South Africa.

Adane retired from the Ethiopian national team in 2015.

Career statistics
Scores and results list Ethiopia's goal tally first, score column indicates score after each Adane goal.

References

External links
 
 

Living people
1985 births
People from Awasa
Sportspeople from Southern Nations, Nationalities, and Peoples' Region
Ethiopian footballers
Association football forwards
Ethiopia international footballers
Ethiopia A' international footballers
2013 Africa Cup of Nations players
Ethiopian Premier League players
Saint George S.C. players
Hawassa City S.C. players
Wolkite City F.C. players